Christman Building may refer to:

 Christman Building (Lansing, Michigan)
 Christman Building (Joplin, Missouri), a prominent contributing building in the Fifth and Main Historic District